Urana FC d'Arlit is a Nigerien football club based in Arlit. The club plays in Niger Premier League.

Stadium
Homematches plays at the 7,000 capacity Stade d'Arlit.

References

External links
Soccerway
RSSSF

Football clubs in Niger
Super Ligue (Niger) clubs